The House of Sturdza, Sturza or Stourdza is the name of an old Moldavian noble family, whose origins can be traced back to the 1540s and whose members played important political role in the history of Moldavia, Russia and later Romania.

Political family
The Sturdza family, a Moldavian princely family, has been long and intimately associated with the government first of Moldavia and afterwards of Romania. Its members belong to two main branches, which trace their descent from either Ioan Sturdza or Alexandru Sturdza, the sons of Chiriac Sturdza, who lived in the 17th century, and may be regarded as the founder of the family. Members active in government:

Ioan Sturdza prince of Moldavia from 1822 to 1828
Mihail Sturdza (1795 – 1884), Prince of Moldavia from 1834 to 1849, modernizer of Moldavia
Alexandru Sturdza, also known as Alexandre Stourdza (1791–1854), Russian publicist and diplomatist
Grigore Sturdza (1821 – 1901), son of Mihail, army general and politician
Dimitrie Sturdza (1833 – 1914), Romanian statesman
Dimitrie C. Sturdza-Scheianu, (1839 – 1920) Romanian historian
Mihail R. Sturdza (1886 – 1980), Romanian minister of Foreign Affairs
Mihai Dimitrie Sturdza (1934 – 2020), Romanian historian
 Alexandru D. Sturdza (1869-1939), romanian Army, colonel, german spy, son of Dimitrie Sturdza (1833-1914), romanian stateman

Others
Roxandra Sturdza (1786 – 1844)
Lucia Sturdza-Bulandra (1873 – 1961), actress and theater director
Marina Sturdza (1944 – 2017), former Romanian Princess and humanitarian activist
Constantin Sturdza (born 1989), tennis player
Dimitri Sturdza (born 1938), tennis player

References

3. Otu, Petre, Georgescu, Maria: Durchleuchtung eines Verrats. Der Fall des Oberst Alexandru D. Sturdza. Lektor Verlag. Hainburg. 2022.

 
Romanian boyar families